Pablo Feijoo Ugalde (born 18 May 1982) is a Spanish rugby sevens former player and current coach. He played in the 2013 Rugby World Cup Sevens in Russia.
He was in the squad that secured the last Olympic spot when they defeated  in Monaco. He was selected for the Spanish national rugby sevens team for the 2016 Summer Olympics. Feijoo retired from international play after the 2016 Olympics.

Feijoo has served as head coach of the Spain national rugby sevens team since the 2016-17 season.

References

External links 
 

1982 births
Living people
Rugby union players from the Basque Country (autonomous community)
Spanish rugby union players
Spain international rugby union players
Rugby sevens players at the 2016 Summer Olympics
Olympic rugby sevens players of Spain
Spain international rugby sevens players
Sportspeople from San Sebastián
Coaches of international rugby sevens teams